The 1930 New South Wales state election was held on 25 October 1930. The election was conducted in single member constituencies with compulsory preferential voting. The election occurred at the height of the Great Depression and was a landslide victory for the expansionary monetary policies of Jack Lang.

As a result of the election, the Nationalist/Country Party coalition government of Thomas Bavin and Ernest Buttenshaw was defeated and the Labor party, led by Jack Lang, formed government with a parliamentary majority of 20. The Parliament first met on 25 November 1930, and had a maximum term of 3 years. However it was dissolved after only 18 months on 18 May 1932  when the Governor, Sir Philip Game dismissed the Premier Jack Lang and commissioned Bertram Stevens to form a caretaker government. Thomas Bavin was the Leader of the Opposition until 5 April 1932 when he was replaced by Bertram Stevens. Michael Bruxner replaced Buttenshaw as leader of the Country Party in early 1932.

Key dates

Results 

{{Australian elections/Title row
| table style = float:right;clear:right;margin-left:1em;
| title        = New South Wales state election, 25 October 1930
| house        = Legislative Assembly
| series       = New South Wales state election
| back         = 1927
| forward      = 1932
| enrolled     = 1,428,648
| total_votes  = 1,325,945
| turnout %    = 94.94
| turnout chg  = +12.4
| informal     = 30,478
| informal %   = 2.25
| informal chg = +0.94
}}

|}

Changing seats

See also
 Candidates of the 1930 New South Wales state election
 Members of the New South Wales Legislative Assembly, 1930–1932

Notes

References

Elections in New South Wales
New South Wales state election
1930s in New South Wales
New South Wales state election